Upper Norton Lake is an alpine lake in Blaine County, Idaho, United States, located in the Smoky Mountains in Sawtooth National Forest. It is most easily accessed from trail 135 from the end of forest road 170. The lake is located northeast of Prairie Creek Peak. It is also near Smoky Lake, Big Lost Lake, Little Lost Lake, and Lower Norton Lake.

References

Lakes of Idaho
Lakes of Blaine County, Idaho
Glacial lakes of the United States
Glacial lakes of the Sawtooth National Forest